There are at least 34 named lakes and reservoirs in Lawrence County, Arkansas.

Lakes
	Brushy Lake, el.  
	Brushy Pond, el.  
	Clear Lake, el.  
	Eagle Pond, el.  
	Fish Pond, el.  
	Horner Bay, el.  
	Horseshoe Lake, el.  
	Horseshoe Lake, el.  
	Long Pond, el.  
	Portia Bay, el.  
	Rainey Brake, el.  
	Robinson Bay, el.  
	Round Pong, el.  
	Sawlog Slough, el.  
	Swan Pond, el.  
	White Pond, el.

Reservoirs
	Byrd Lakes, el.  
	Cooper Creek Site Five Reservoir, el.  
	Cooper Creek Site Four Reservoir, el.  
	Cooper Creek Site One Reservoir, el.  
	Cooper Creek Site Six Reservoir, el.  
	Cooper Creek Site Three Reservoir, el.  
	Cooper Creek Site Two Reservoir, el.  
	Digman Lake, el.  
	Doctor Ralph Joseph Lake, el.  
	Flat Creek Site Five Reservoir, el.  
	Flat Creek Site Four Reservoir, el.  
	Flat Creek Site Six Reservoir, el.  
	Flat Creek Site Two Reservoir, el.  
	Lake Charles, el.  
	Little Joe Lake, el.  
	Phillips Lake, el.  
	Rainwater Lake, el.  
	Ralph McDonald Lake, el.

See also

 List of lakes in Arkansas

Notes

Bodies of water of Lawrence County, Arkansas
Lawrence